Kirkland (foaled 1896) was an Irish-bred Thoroughbred racehorse who competed in National Hunt racing.

Kirkland is most famous for winning the 1905 Grand National while being ridden by Frank Mason. He was the first, and so far only, Welsh-trained horse to have won the Grand National.

Grand National record

Pedigree

References 

1896 racehorse births
Racehorses bred in Ireland
Racehorses trained in the United Kingdom
Grand National winners